Gilio Bisagno (31 January 1903 – 16 December 1987) was an Italian freestyle swimmer who competed in the 1920 Summer Olympics. He was born in Sampierdarena.

In 1920 he was a member of the Italian relay team which finished fifth in the 4 x 200 metre freestyle relay competition. He also participated in the 400 metre freestyle event and in the 1500 metre freestyle competition but in both he was eliminated in the first round.

References

External links
 
 Report on Italian Olympic swimmers 

1903 births
1987 deaths
Italian male swimmers
Olympic swimmers of Italy
Swimmers at the 1920 Summer Olympics
Italian male freestyle swimmers
People from Sampierdarena